Mary of Great Britain may refer to:
 Princess Mary of Great Britain (1723–1772), second-youngest daughter of King George II

See also
 Princess Mary (disambiguation)
 Queen Mary (disambiguation)